Robert Munford III (1737-1783) was an American playwright, civic leader and soldier, having served under Colonel George Washington in the French and Indian War and later serving in the Revolutionary War.

Munford was the son of Robert Munford II and his wife Anna Beverley Munford. Munford hailed from Mecklenburg County, Virginia where he was an influential land owner and served on the first county government which formed there in 1765.  He is best known, however, for his literary works as he is regarded to be the author of the first comedic plays written in America, The Candidates (ca. 1770) and The Patriots (ca. 1777). He also wrote a handful of poems, and left at his death an incomplete translation of the Metamorphoses of Ovid.  No record survives of any public performance of either play, although it is possible that they may have been shown privately.

Munford is currently buried near the site of his homestead, most of which currently rests below John H. Kerr Reservoir near Boydton, Virginia.  His gravestone can be viewed along the Robert Munford Hiking Trail, which is owned and managed by the U.S. Army Corps of Engineers.

One of Munford's poems was published in 1779, but much of his work remained unseen by the public before his death.  In 1798 his son published a volume containing both plays, a handful of poems, and the first book of Metamorphoses.

References

External links
A Collection of Plays and Poems, by the Late Col. Robert Munford, of Mecklenburg County, in the State of Virginia. Now First Published Together: Electronic Edition at the University of North Carolina

1737 births
18th-century American dramatists and playwrights
People of Virginia in the French and Indian War
People of Virginia in the American Revolution
Beverley family of Virginia
People from Mecklenburg County, Virginia
Virginia colonial people
1783 deaths
American male dramatists and playwrights
American male poets
18th-century American poets
18th-century American male writers
Poets from Virginia